Kėdainiai Atžalynas gymnasium is a high school in Kėdainiai, Lithuania, established in 1944.

History 
The school was established in 1944 as a girls gymnasium based in the old town of Kėdainiai which later, in 1950, was named Kėdainiai 2nd Secondary School. During 1953-1974, the school was based in the building of now-former Jonusas Radvila Study Centre. Eventually, it was moved to its current location to a purpose-built building in the new part of the city.

In 1993 it was given a name of Atžalynas, which roughly translates as "offspring". On 1 March 2010, the school received a status of gymnasium and is now called Kėdainiai Atžalynas gymnasium.

References

Schools in Lithuania
Buildings and structures in Kėdainiai